Romeoville High School, or RHS, is a public four-year high school located in Romeoville, Illinois, a southwest suburb of Chicago, Illinois, in the United States. The high school opened in 1963 as Lockport West. Lockport West school colors were navy blue and white. Orange was added when the school changed to Romeoville High School.

Romeoville High School is located in northern Will County, Illinois, about 30 miles southwest of downtown Chicago and about seven miles north of Joliet, Illinois, along Illinois Routes 7, 53, and 171. The Des Plaines River runs through the community, as part of the Illinois-Michigan Canal.

Early history

Valley View Community Unit School District 365U was originally known as District 94. It took its present name when it became the first school district in the United States to implement the 45-15 plan, in which schools were occupied year round with 3/4 of the students in session at any one time. Students went to school for 9 weeks and then had 3 weeks off. Additionally, teachers were optionally allowed to work year-round. This practice is no longer in use.

Athletics

Romeoville competes in the Southwest Prairie Conference (SPC) and is a member of the Illinois High School Association (IHSA); the organization which governs most sports and competitive activities for high schools in the state. Teams are stylized as the Spartans.

Athletics at Romeoville High School include badminton, baseball, basketball, bowling, cheerleading, cross country, football, golf, gymnastics, pom poms, soccer, softball, tennis, track and field, volleyball, wrestling, marching band, and color guard. The school is part of a boys hockey club that is a combination of high schools in Lockport, Lemont, and Bolingbrook.

References

High school
Educational institutions established in 1963
Public high schools in Illinois
Schools in Will County, Illinois
1963 establishments in Illinois